CSU Galați is a Romanian women's volleyball club based in Galaţi. The club plays in the Divizia A1, the highest Romanian league. The club won the Divizia A1 in four occasions, the Romanian Cup three times and has also played in European competitions before it was dissolved in 2010. The club was refounded later and promoted back to Divizia A1 at the end of the 2017–18 Divizia A2 season.

Honours

National competitions
  Romanian Championship: 4
2006–07, 2007–08, 2008–09, 2009–10

  Romanian Cup: 3
2006–07, 2007–08, 2008–09

Notable former players

References

External links
 Profile at CEV

Romanian volleyball clubs
Sport in Galați
Sports teams in Romania
Volleyball clubs established in 1953
1953 establishments in Romania